Bita Lake is a plateau lake in Shangri-La County, Yunnan Province, southwest of China. The lake is located in Pudacuo National Park and has a total area of about 1.4 square kilometers, with an elevation of 3539 m.

Notes

Lakes of Yunnan
Geography of Dêqên Tibetan Autonomous Prefecture